Geoffrey Haldane Old (born 22 January 1956) is a former New Zealand rugby union player. Predominantly a number eight, Old represented Taranaki briefly and then Manawatu at a provincial level, and was a member of the New Zealand national side, the All Blacks, from 1980 to 1983. He played 17 matches for the All Blacks including three internationals. He later coached the Dutch national side between 1997 and 1999.

References

1956 births
Living people
People from Eltham, New Zealand
People educated at New Plymouth Boys' High School
New Zealand rugby union players
New Zealand international rugby union players
Taranaki rugby union players
Manawatu rugby union players
Rugby union number eights
New Zealand rugby union coaches
New Zealand expatriate sportspeople in the Netherlands
Expatriate sportspeople in the Netherlands
Netherlands national rugby union team coaches